Ardentes is a commune in the Indre department in the Centre-Val de Loire region. The archaeologist Jean Hubert (1902–1994) was born in Ardentes.

Population

See also
Communes of the Indre department

References

Communes of Indre